The 2010 Bank of the West Classic was a women's tennis tournament played on outdoor hard courts. It was the 39th edition of the Bank of the West Classic, and is a part of the WTA Premier tournaments of the 2010 WTA Tour. It took place at the Taube Tennis Center in Stanford, California, United States, from July 26 through August 1, 2010. It was the first women's event on the 2010 US Open Series. Victoria Azarenka won the singles title.

Champions

Singles

 Victoria Azarenka defeated  Maria Sharapova, 6–4, 6–1.
It was Azarenka's first title of the year and 4th of her career.

Doubles

 Lindsay Davenport /  Liezel Huber defeated  Chan Yung-jan /  Zheng Jie, 7–5, 6–7(8–10), 10–8.

Entrants

Seeds

 Seedings are based on the rankings of July 19, 2010.
 Vera Zvonareva has withdrawn from the tournament.

Other entrants
The following players received wildcards into the singles main draw

  Victoria Azarenka
  Hilary Barte
  Ana Ivanovic
  Dinara Safina

The following players received entry from the qualifying draw:
  Chang Kai-chen
  Mirjana Lučić
  Christina McHale
  Olga Savchuk

The following player received entry from a protected ranking:
  Ashley Harkleroad

References

External links

Official Bank of the West Classic website
2010 match results

Bank of the West Classic
Bank of the West Classic
Silicon Valley Classic
Bank of the West Classic
Bank of the West Classic
Bank of the West Classic